Antonio José Orejuela Rivero (born 2 December 1960) is a Spanish retired footballer who played as a midfielder.

Over the course of nine seasons he amassed La Liga totals of 211 games and 30 goals in representation of four clubs, mainly Atlético Madrid (five years).

Club career
After immigrating with his parents to the country at the age of six, Madrid-born Orejuela began his professional career in Germany, playing in the second division with FSV Frankfurt. He returned to his homeland in 1983, starting with UD Salamanca and RCD Mallorca – in both cases he would suffer relegation from La Liga, in four seasons of play; he made his debut in the competition with the former club, playing the full 90 minutes in a 0–0 away draw against CA Osasuna on 4 September 1983.

In the 1988–89 campaign, Orejuela signed for Atlético Madrid. During his five-year stay with the Colchoneros he was regularly used in the first two, but suffered greatly with injuries in the other three (just 12 matches combined) precisely as the team from the capital won back-to-back Copa del Rey trophies, in 1991 and 1992.

Orejuela then played one season with neighbours Rayo Vallecano, appearing more but being again relegated from the top level. He subsequently returned to Mallorca for a further campaign, now in the second division, and retired at 36 after a spell in the amateur championships.

Honours
Atlético Madrid
Copa del Rey: 1990–91, 1991–92

References

External links

1960 births
Living people
Footballers from Madrid
Spanish footballers
Association football midfielders
2. Bundesliga players
FSV Frankfurt players
La Liga players
Segunda División players
Segunda División B players
UD Salamanca players
RCD Mallorca players
Atlético Madrid footballers
Rayo Vallecano players
Granada CF footballers
CD Atlético Baleares footballers
Spain under-21 international footballers
Spain under-23 international footballers
Spanish expatriate footballers
Expatriate footballers in Germany
Spanish expatriate sportspeople in Germany